The 1963 Hofstra Flying Dutchmen football team was an American football team that represented Hofstra University during the 1963 NCAA College Division football season. Hofstra was nominally a member of the Middle Atlantic Conference, College–Northern Division, but played no games within the division.

In their 14th year under head coach Howard "Howdy" Myers Jr., the Flying Dutchmen compiled a 3–6 record, and were outscored 234 to 219. Ray DiScala and Len Garille were the team captains. 

This was Hofstra's last year in the MAC College–Northern Division. Just before the season began, the MAC's executive committee approved Hofstra's transfer to the more competitive University Division, effective in September 1964. In six years of MAC football play, Hofstra had never played enough College Division teams to qualify for the division championship, instead playing mostly local opponents in the New York metropolitan area and New England, as well as several members of the MAC University Division. The 1963 schedule featured no MAC College Division opponents and only one MAC University Division opponent, Temple.

With their first home game of 1963, the Flying Dutchmen opened their new home field, Hofstra Stadium in Hempstead on Long Island, New York.

Schedule

References

Hofstra
Hofstra Pride football seasons
Hofstra Flying Dutchmen football